CYP4X1 (cytochrome P450, family 4, subfamily X, polypeptide 1) is a protein which in humans is encoded by the CYP4X1 gene.

This gene encodes a member of the cytochrome P450 superfamily of enzymes. The cytochrome P450 proteins are monooxygenases which catalyze many reactions involved in drug metabolism and synthesis of cholesterol, steroids and other lipids. The expression pattern of a similar rat protein suggests that this protein may be involved in neurovascular function in the brain.

References

Further reading